Sankara Matam Road is a major road in the Indian city of Visakhapatnam. The name of the road is derived from a famous Hindu Matam  that is located nearby. It is one of the busiest roads that connects to Dwaraka Nagar to Akkayyapalem. this road is commercially well developed.

References

Roads in Visakhapatnam
Neighbourhoods in Visakhapatnam